Narindasaurus (meaning "lizard of Narinda Bay") is a genus of turiasaurian sauropod dinosaur from the Middle Jurassic Isalo III Formation of Madagascar. The type species, N. thevenini was formally described by Royo-Torres et al. in 2020. The holotype, which consists of one specimen, is currently stored at the Muséum national d’Histoire naturelle and has been since 1906 or 1907.

Discovery and naming 
The holotype was discovered in the Isalo III Formation before 1894 by Joseph Thomas Last, and were briefly noted on by Paul Lemoine in 1906. Armand Thevenin (1861-1942) was the first to diagnose Narindasaurus. In 1907, he placed it within the now obsolete species "Bothriospondylus madagascariensis", which is now known as Lapparentosaurus. It was briefly mentioned in 1972 and it was reevaluated in 2008 and 2010 as both a distinct taxon and a non-neosauropod eusauropod. It was classified as a turiasaur in 2015. The species Narindasaurus thevenini was formally named in 2020.

The holotype consists of a partial skeleton composed by a right maxillary or premaxillary tooth (MNHN MAJ 423), an anterior caudal vertebra (MNHN MAJ 424), a posterior caudal vertebra (MNHN MAJ 426), a middle-anterior chevron (MNHN MAJ 425), a right ulna (MNHN MAJ 427), a right tibia (MNHN MAJ 428), a right fibula with a distal chevron attached (MNHN MAJ 429) and a left pubis (MNHN MAJ 430).

Gallery

References 

Turiasauria
Middle Jurassic dinosaurs of Africa
Bathonian life
Callovian life
Fossils of Madagascar
Fossil taxa described in 2020
Dinosaurs of India and Madagascar